Jason Harris (born June 29, 1971 in Fairfax, Virginia) is president and CEO of Mekanism Inc., a San Francisco-based creative agency.

Career
Harris began his career working for 10 years in business and strategic roles at TBWA\Chiat\Day and Leagas Delaney, where he led accounts and notable campaigns for clients like PlayStation, Levi's, and Disney. Harris also worked at Ketchum Advertising. He later founded Plan C, an entertainment company that focused on producing branded television projects including Adidas Superstars, which aired nationwide on Fox Sports, as well as projects for Xbox.

Mekanism
Harris has served as the President and CEO of Mekanism.  Since joining Mekanism, Harris has helped the agency produce campaigns for such companies as HBO, Muscle Milk, The North Face, PepsiCo, MillerCoors and Ben and Jerry's. Accounts won by during Harris's time as CEO include Alaska Airlines, Virgin America, Jim Beam, Nordstrom, and the United Nations.

In 2014, Mekanism led the White House's "It's on Us" campaign to raise awareness of campus sexual assault. The campaign is currently in its third year. In 2015, Mekanism acquired Epic Signal, a company founded in 2013 that works with brands like Bud Light and NBC to run video campaigns with YouTube, Snapchat, Vine, Periscope and Instagram.

Awards
During Harris' time as CEO, the agency has twice been named the "Small Agency of the Year" by Ad Age, won four Effie Awards, three Cannes Lions Awards, three London International Awards, a D&AD Award, and four Webby Awards. Mekanism has also been listed as one of the top 50 most creative companies by Creativity magazine. In January 2015, the company was named to Advertising Age's A List and was named one of the most effective Independent Agencies in America later that year.

In 2018, Jason was named to the Top 100 Influencers in 2018 by Creative Pool, an online resource for agencies, brands and individuals.

In 2014, Mekanism created an ad for Pepsi which ran during the Super Bowl and was ranked by USA Today as the tenth best Super Bowl ad that year. Mekanism was named as one of Advertising Age'''s best places to work in 2016.

Influence
Harris is on the board of directors for Advertising Week, the United Nations Social Impact Leadership Council and an advising member of the Marketing 50.Monllos, Kristina The United Nations Is Working on the 'World's Largest Advertising Campaign'  AdWeek. July 7, 2015 He is also a co-chair and founding member of Civic Nation Creative Alliance in partnership with The White House. Regarding his work with the United Nations, whose goals are to end poverty and hunger and achieve gender equality, Harris has said, "The campaign, in a way...is sort of re-launching what the UN stands for and how the UN helps solve problems in the world." Harris is also a Board Member for Haymakers for Hope (H4H): An official 501(c)(3) charity organization that gives you the opportunity to fight back against cancer.

His methods have been covered and studied by Harvard Business School. He a frequent lecturer on topics such as brand storytelling and involvement marketing. Harris is also a judge for the Effie Awards, Webby Awards, and the Favourite Website Awards. In 2015, Harris was named the fifth most influential social impact leader.

In 2017, Harris was named by the 4As (American Association of Advertising Agencies) as one of the top "100 People Who Make Advertising Great."

In 2018, he delivered the commencement speech at his alma mater, James Madison University.

Harris is the author of The Soulful Art of Persuasion'' (Penguin Random House, 2019. ). In the book, Harris argues that genuine persuasion is about personal character rather than facts and arguments. Based on his experience in business communication, Harris provides 4 key principles and 11 habits for negotiating in an era of social media and global transparency.

References

External links
Mekanism
The Soulful Art of Persuasion

1971 births
Living people
Online advertising
American chief executives
American marketing people
Branding consultants